This is a list of British colonial administrators of Aden from the 1839 Aden Expedition to the 1967 withdrawal from Aden. They were appointed from British India until 1937 when the Chief Commissioner's Province of Aden became the Colony of Aden under the responsibility of the Colonial Office in London.

Aden merged into independent South Yemen on 30 November 1967. For British representation since then, see: List of ambassadors of the United Kingdom to Yemen.

List

See also
Aden Province
Colony of Aden
Federation of South Arabia
State of Aden

References

British representatives at Aden
British representatives
Aden
Aden
United Kingdom–Yemen relations